Fairfield County is a county located in the U.S. state of South Carolina. As of the 2020 census, its population was 20,948. Its county seat is Winnsboro.

Fairfield County is part of the Columbia, SC Metropolitan Statistical Area.

History

18th century
It is alleged that the county name originated from a statement made by General Cornwallis when he declared "How Fair These Fields" during the British occupation of the area in 1780–81. The house Cornwallis stayed in during the occupation is still standing.

Several years before the Revolution, Richard Winn from Virginia moved to what is now called Fairfield County. His lands covered the present site of Winnsboro, and as early as 1777 the settlement was known as "Winnsborough".

The village was laid out and chartered in 1785 upon petition of Richard Winn, John Winn and John Vanderhorst. John Richard, and Minor Winn all served in the Revolutionary War. Richard was a General and he is said to have fought in more battles than any patriot in South Carolina.

Fairfield County has numerous churches, some of which have existed for over 200 years. Perhaps the most famous church, built in 1788, is the Old Brick Church, where the Associate Reformed Presbyterian Synod of the Carolinas was organized in 1803. A note penciled on the wall of the Old Brick Church is testimony to a Union soldier's regret at the church's floor boards being taken up to build a crossing over the nearby river for General Sherman's troops during the American Civil War.

The early settlers in the mid-18th century brought cotton to the county. It was soon supported as a commodity crop by the labor of enslaved African Americans.

19th century
Invention of the cotton gin enabled the cultivation of short-staple cotton through the upcountry regions of the South. It was the chief commodity crop for this county from the early 19th century through the 1920s. In the antebellum era, most of the intensive labor was accomplished by African-American slaves, many of whose descendants still live in this rural area. After the Civil War, many African Americans initially worked as sharecroppers and tenant farmers. Over time the soil became depleted, but more damaging was infestation in the 20th century by the boll weevil. Together with mechanization of agriculture, the need for labor was reduced. In the first half of the 20th century through the 1940s, millions of African Americans left the rural South in the Great Migration to northern and midwestern cities for other job opportunities and the chance to escape Jim Crow restrictions.

In December 1832 Winnsboro was incorporated as a town to be governed by an intendant and wardens. The most prominent architectural feature of Fairfield County is the Town Clock in Winnsboro. South Carolina's General Assembly authorized Winnsboro's town fathers to build a market house that "shall not be of greater width than " to allow  of wagon travel on either side. The narrow building was modeled after Independence Hall in Philadelphia and built on the site of a duck pond. A clock was added in 1837, and the building has since been known as the Town Clock.

The County Courthouse, across from the Town Clock, dates back to 1823. Designed by South Carolina architect Robert Mills, the courthouse houses records dating to the mid-18th century.

Reconstruction
During Reconstruction the Fairfield District was changed into Fairfield County and was occupied by Union troops.  The South Carolina state constitution of 1868 was such that those who fought for the confederacy were barred from voting in the 1868 elections.  As a result most eligible voters in Fairfield County were African-American.  In 1868 there were 942 whites in the county were eligible to vote and 2,434 African-Americans who were eligible to vote. In the election held under these circumstances an African-American man, George Barber, was elected to represent Fairfield County in the South Carolina State Senate.  In the same election the county elected three people to the South Carolina state house of representatives.  Henry Jacob and Henry Johnson, who were African-Americans and L.W. Duvall who was white.  This was considered revolutionary at the time and those who had previously been slave owners were extremely angry.  Due to how much social spending the Reconstruction government engaged in, by the end of 1870 Fairfield County was one of only two counties in the state that was not in debt.  During the Presidential election of 1872, there were three companies of U.S. troops stationed in Fairfield County to prevent the Ku Klux Klan from disrupting voting.

Granite deposits in the County led to the early development of quarrying. Winnsboro blue granite, "The Silk of the Trade," is used worldwide in buildings and monuments.

20th century
The county was home to the Carolinas–Virginia Tube Reactor during the 1960s. In 1984 the Virgil C. Summer Nuclear Generating Station was built here.  The county owns the Fairfield County Airport, in operation since 1975. The Ridgeway gold mine, east of Ridgeway, was in operation from 1988 to 1999.

Geography

The Enoree Ranger District of the Sumter National Forest provides opportunities for outdoor recreation. The county has an abundance of deer and wild turkeys, making it an attraction for hunters. It is home to the Lake Wateree State Recreation Area.

National Protected area 
 Sumter National Forest (part)

State and local protected areas/sites 
 Lake Monticello Park
 Lake Wateree State Park
 Monticello Recreational Lake Beach
 The South Carolina Railroad Museum
 Upland Wings Preserve

Major water bodies 
 Big Cedar Creek
 Broad River
 Catawba River
 Great Falls Lake
 Lake Wateree
 Monticello Reservoir
 Persimmon Creek

Adjacent counties 
 Chester County - north
 Lancaster County - northeast
 Union County - northwest
 Kershaw County - east
 Richland County - south
 Newberry County - southwest

Major highways

Major infrastructure 
 Fairfield County Airport

Demographics

2020 census

As of the 2020 United States census, there were 20,948 people, 9,191 households, and 5,921 families residing in the county.

2010 census
As of the 2010 United States Census, there were 23,956 people, 9,419 households, and 6,578 families living in the county. The racial makeup of the county was 59.1% black or African American, 38.6% white, 0.2% Asian, 0.2% American Indian, 0.8% from other races, and 1.1% from two or more races. Those of Hispanic or Latino origin made up 1.6% of the population. In terms of ancestry, 18.0% were American, 6.0% were English, 5.4% were Irish, 5.3% were Subsaharan African, and 5.0% were German.

Of the 9,419 households, 32.5% had children under the age of 18 living with them, 42.8% were married couples living together, 21.3% had a female householder with no husband present, 30.2% were non-families, and 26.5% of all households were made up of individuals. The average household size was 2.50 and the average family size was 3.01. The median age was 42.4 years.

The median income for a household in the county was $32,022 and the median income for a family was $40,849. Males had a median income of $39,837 versus $28,695 for females. The per capita income for the county was $18,877. About 15.8% of families and 22.7% of the population were below the poverty line, including 29.7% of those under age 18 and 20.7% of those age 65 or over.

2000 census
As of the census of 2000, there were 23,454 people, 8,774 households, and 6,387 families living in the county.  The population density was 34 people per square mile (13/km2).  There were 10,383 housing units at an average density of 15 per square mile (6/km2).  The racial makeup of the county was 59.09% Black or African American, 39.58% White, 0.19% Asian, 0.15% Native American, 0.44% from other races, and 0.55% from two or more races.  1.07% of the population were Hispanic or Latino of any race.

There were 8,774 households, out of which 32.40% had children under the age of 18 living with them, 47.90% were married couples living together, 20.00% had a female householder with no husband present, and 27.20% were non-families. 24.40% of all households were made up of individuals, and 9.40% had someone living alone who was 65 years of age or older.  The average household size was 2.63 and the average family size was 3.12.

In the county, the population was spread out, with 26.10% under the age of 18, 8.60% from 18 to 24, 27.80% from 25 to 44, 24.30% from 45 to 64, and 13.20% who were 65 years of age or older.  The median age was 37 years. For every 100 females, there were 90.90 males.  For every 100 females age 18 and over, there were 88.80 males.

The median income for a household in the county was $30,376, and the median income for a family was $35,943. Males had a median income of $29,033 versus $21,197 for females. The per capita income for the county was $14,911.  About 17.20% of families and 19.60% of the population were below the poverty line, including 24.70% of those under age 18 and 24.10% of those age 65 or over.

Government and politics

County Council
Moses W. Bell - District 1, Chairman
Shirley M. Greene - District 2, Vice Chair
Mikel Trapp - District 3
Timothy Roseborough - District 4
Douglas Pauley - District 5
Cornelius Robinson - District 6
Clarence Gilbert - District 7

County Administrator

Director of Economic Development
Margaret Broadwater

Crime
Fairfield County’s violent crime rate is 629, as compared to the South Carolina average of 521 and the top performing states at 62. The measure is the number of violent crimes reported per 100,000 population. Violent crimes are defined as offenses that involve a face-to-face confrontation between the victim and the perpetrator, including homicide, rape, robbery, and aggravated assault. According to CrimeGrade.org, Fairfield County is listed as D+ on an A-F grading scale. This means that the rate of crime is higher than the average US county. Fairfield County is in the 29th percentile for safety, meaning 71% of counties are safer and 29% of counties are more dangerous.

Poverty
Based on the Fairfield County Community Health Needs Assessment Report conducted in March 2018, the median household income for Fairfield County is $36,004 which is considerably lower than the state median at $46,898. Of the county’s 22,653 residents, 23% live in poverty. Fairfield County’s rate of Children in Poverty is 32%, which is greater than the South Carolina average of 23% and far exceeds the top performing states at 12%.

Communities

Towns
 Blythewood (Mostly in Richland County)
 Jenkinsville
 Ridgeway
 Winnsboro (county seat and largest town)

Census-designated place
 Winnsboro Mills

Unincorporated communities
 Adger
 Blackjack
 Blackstock
 Blair
 Bucklick
 Feasterville
 Longtown
 Mitford
 Monticello
 Rion

See also 
 List of counties in South Carolina
 National Register of Historic Places listings in Fairfield County, South Carolina
 South Carolina State Parks
 List of national forests of the United States

References

External links

 
 
 Fairfield County History and Images

 
Columbia metropolitan area (South Carolina)
1785 establishments in South Carolina
Populated places established in 1785
Black Belt (U.S. region)
Majority-minority counties in South Carolina